NBA, also referred to as NBA 2005, is a basketball video game developed by San Diego Studio and published by Sony Computer Entertainment for the PSP in 2005. It was the first licensed basketball game to be released for the system.

Gameplay
NBA has four main modes: Quick Play, Online, Game Modes, and Mini-Games, with the four basic Game Modes being practice, exhibition, season, and playoffs.

Reception

The game received "mixed" reviews according to the review aggregation website Metacritic.

References

External links
 

2005 video games
Sony Interactive Entertainment games
North America-exclusive video games
National Basketball Association video games
PlayStation Portable games
PlayStation Portable-only games
Video games developed in the United States
San Diego Studio games
Multiplayer and single-player video games